Hugh Callingham Wheeler (19 March 1912 – 26 July 1987) was a British novelist, screenwriter, librettist, poet and translator. He resided in the United States from 1934 until his death and became a naturalized citizen in 1942. He had attended London University.

Under the noms de plume Patrick Quentin, Q. Patrick and Jonathan Stagge, Wheeler was the author or co-author of many mystery novels and short stories.  In 1963, his 1961 collection, The Ordeal of Mrs. Snow was given a Special Edgar Award by the Mystery Writers of America. He won the Tony Award and the Drama Desk Award for Outstanding Book of a Musical in 1973 and 1974 for his books for the musicals A Little Night Music and Candide, and won both again in 1979 for his book for Sweeney Todd.

Wheeler is credited as "research consultant" for the film Cabaret, though numerous sources list him as co-writer of the screenplay.

Additional stage musical credits
Irene (new libretto) (1973)
Truckload  (1975)
Pacific Overtures ("additional material")  (1975)
The Little Prince and the Aviator  (1982)
Meet Me in St. Louis  (1989)

Plays
Big Fish, Little Fish  (1961)
Look, We've Come Through (1961)
We Have Always Lived in the Castle (1966)

Screenplays
Something for Everyone (1970)
Travels with My Aunt (1972)
A Little Night Music (1978)
Nijinsky (1980)

Novels
The Crippled Muse (1951)

Awards and achievements

References

External links

 

1912 births
1987 deaths
American musical theatre librettists
English mystery writers
Edgar Award winners
Drama Desk Award winners
Tony Award winners
English expatriates in the United States
Alumni of the University of London
People from Hampstead
Place of death missing
20th-century English novelists